Dmitri Yevegenyevich Tarasov (born February 13, 1979) is a Russian former professional ice hockey forward who most notably played for Amur Khabarovsk in the Kontinental Hockey League. He served as the captain for the club.

Career
Tarasov began his career in the old Russian Super League with Amur Khabarovsk. The team suffered relegation to the Vysshaya Liga in 2004 but Tarasov continued to play for them until 2006 when he joined Salavat Yulaev Ufa. After two seasons, Tarasov joined HC Dynamo Moscow and moved to Spartak Moscow during the 2008-09 season.

Tarasov later returned to his original club Amur Khabarovsk, and served 5 seasons as team captain. He signed a one-year extension to continue in Khabarovsk on July 10, 2015.

References

External links

1979 births
Amur Khabarovsk players
HC Dynamo Moscow players
HC Spartak Moscow players
Living people
Russian ice hockey left wingers
Salavat Yulaev Ufa players
HC Sibir Novosibirsk players